Carbon County School District #1 is a public school district based in Rawlins, Wyoming, United States.

Geography
Carbon County School District #1 serves the western portion of Carbon County and a small portion of northeastern Sweetwater County, including the following communities:

Incorporated places
Town of Baggs
Town of Bairoil
City of Rawlins
Town of Sinclair
Unincorporated places
Savery

Schools
Grades 9-12
Rawlins High School
Rawlins Cooperative High School (Alternative)
Grades 6-8
Rawlins Middle School
Grades K-5
Rawlins Elementary School
Grades K-12
Little Snake River Valley School

Administration

The superintendent of Carbon County School District One as of 2017-18 school year is Mike Hamel.

Student demographics
The following figures are as of October 1, 2009.

Total District Enrollment: 1,803
Student enrollment by gender
Male: 936 (51.91%)
Female: 867 (48.09%)
Student enrollment by ethnicity
American Indian or Alaska Native: 20 (1.11%)
Asian: 13 (0.72%)
Black or African American: 15 (0.83%)
Hispanic or Latino: 522 (28.95%)
Native Hawaiian or Other Pacific Islander: 11 (0.61%)
Two or More Races: 43 (2.38%)
White: 1,179 (65.39%)

See also
List of school districts in Wyoming

References

External links
Carbon County School District #1 – official site.

Education in Carbon County, Wyoming
Education in Sweetwater County, Wyoming
School districts in Wyoming
Rawlins, Wyoming